Sam FM was an adult hits format radio station that broadcast on 106.5 MHz FM in Bristol, United Kingdom and owned by Bauer Radio. The station formed part of the Hits Radio network, although its entire output and playlist was locally produced and took no network programming. It ceased broadcasting on 6 September 2021 when it rebranded to Hits Radio Bristol & The South West.

History

Original 106.5
The station was awarded its original broadcast licence in September 2006 as Original 106.5, and commenced broadcasting on 20 May 2007. It was owned by a group of investors under the name Tomahawk Radio. The station originally broadcast an Adult Oriented format, with 40% of its music coming from past or present Top 20 charts.

Jack FM

106 Jack FM replaced Original, which had previously broadcast using the same frequency, on 2 December 2009 following a staged on-air argument and station hijacking the previous day.

The station was acquired by Celador Radio on 7 September 2010.

Rebrand to Sam FM and merger
From 1 April 2015, the Jack FM name was dropped in favour of Sam FM by the station owner Celador Radio, who decided on changing the name six months beforehand. The station's topical imaging are voiced by actor and comedian Gareth Hale (of Hale and Pace).

On 25 May 2016, OFCOM announced it had granted Celador permission to merge the station with its sister station in Swindon. The company said the Swindon station was not financially viable as a stand-alone service, having made a £50,000 loss in 2015. The station continued to broadcast its weekday breakfast show from Bristol - shared with the Swindon station - and retained local news bulletins, traffic updates and what's on information.

Following the purchase of Celador Radio by Bauer Radio in 2019, Sam FM Swindon became part of the Greatest Hits Radio network in September 2020, leaving the Bristol Sam FM  as a standalone operation again.

DAB
Sam FM was removed from DAB in 2015, but three years later was re-added to Bristol's DAB Mux in a bid to increase listener reach.

Hits Radio Bristol & The South West 
On 6 September 2021, Sam FM was rebranded as Hits Radio Bristol and The South West. The station takes the national networked breakfast show from Hits Radio UK hosted by Fleur East, James Barr & Matt weekdays from 6am-10am. The drive-time slot is hosted by Max & Jason weekdays from 4pm-7pm.

See also
Greatest Hits Radio Bristol & The South West
Hits Radio South Coast
Greatest Hits Radio South Coast
Greatest Hits Radio Swindon

References

External links

Radio stations in Bristol
Organisations based in Bristol
Radio stations established in 2009